Tyne & Wear Archives & Museums (TWAM) is a regional group of United Kingdom national museums and the county archives service located across the Tyne and Wear area of north-east England. They have been administered by a joint board of local authorities since the abolition of the Tyne and Wear Metropolitan County Council in 1986.

They receive financial support from the five local authorities they operate within and since 2012, Arts Council England. The service is one of those specified in the Designation Scheme administered by Arts Council England. In the past, the service received additional financial support from the Department for Culture, Media and Sport.

Since 2021, the director has been Keith Merrin.

Museums 
Tyne & Wear Archives & Museums are responsible for managing the 9 museums and galleries below and the county archives. They also share use of the Regional Museums Store at Beamish Museum.

Archives
Tyne and Wear Archives are based within the Discovery Museum.

Gallery

Cross Service Collaborative Ventures
Partnership between the museums and galleries both inside and outside of TWAM has been a significant matter. One example is The Late Shows which has run every May since 2007. Another large-scale project has been "A History of the North East in 100 Objects" that launched in June 2013.

See also
ComputerTown UK (formerly based in the museum)

References

External links 

 
 Tyne & Wear Archives & Museums at Google Cultural Institute
 Tyne & Wear Archives, public domain photos at Flickr
 Tyne & Wear Archives & Museums 3 June Wikipedia training

 
Museums sponsored by the Department for Digital, Culture, Media and Sport
Musical instrument museums in England